Electric Transit, Inc. (ETI) was a joint venture between the Škoda group in the Czech Republic and AAI Corporation in the United States which made trolleybuses for the Dayton and San Francisco trolleybus systems, constructing a total of 330 trolleybuses. ETI was formed in 1994, and ownership was divided as 65% by Škoda and 35% by AAI. The latter was a wholly owned subsidiary of United Industrial Corporation. Up to that time, Škoda had built more than 12,000 trolleybuses since 1935, but none for cities outside Europe and Asia. The ETI joint venture was dissolved in 2004, shortly after an unsuccessful bid to supply trolleybuses to Vancouver.

Corporate history and production

ETI was formed in 1994 as a joint venture, with ownership divided as 65% by Škoda and 35% by AAI. The latter was a wholly owned subsidiary of United Industrial Corporation and was mainly a defense contractor. ETI originally was based in Dayton, but after completion of the contract for that city, the Dayton office was closed and ETI moved its administrative office to Hunt Valley, sharing space with partner AAI there.

AAI announced in 1999 its intent to acquire Škoda Ostrov, the trolleybus manufacturing division of Skoda, as well as the 65% share Škoda held in ETI. United Industrial announced it was selling its interest in ETI in September 2000 to RailWorks Corporation as it planned to exit the transportation market altogether, but RailWorks terminated the offer less than three weeks after the announcement.

In 2003, ETI engaged in a competitive bidding for a large contract (245 trolleybuses) being offered by TransLink, of Vancouver, B.C., Canada for supply of trolleybuses to the Vancouver trolleybus system, but lost out to New Flyer Industries. The joint venture did not seek any further new business, and in May 2004 it finalized an agreement with San Francisco Muni to transfer to Muni its remaining contractual obligations.

Contracts with Dayton and San Francisco
The company was awarded its first contract in November 1994, when the Miami Valley Regional Transit Authority, of Dayton, Ohio placed an order for 63 two-axle trolleybuses. The order was later reduced to 61 vehicles, and ultimately to 57. Three prototype trolleybuses were delivered in December 1995 and January 1996. These were designated by ETI as model 14TrE, the E standing for "export", and were given fleet numbers 9601–9603 by MVRTA. Following modifications to the design, construction of the 54 production-series ETI trolleybuses for Dayton took place in 1998–99. These were model 14TrE2 and were numbered 9801–9854 in MVRTA's fleet.

In July 1997, San Francisco Muni contracted with ETI for the provision of 250 trolleybuses, comprising 220 standard/two-axle and 30 articulated vehicles. ETI designated the two types for San Francisco as models 14TrSF and 15TrSF, respectively.

In February 2000, Muni exercised contract options to purchase an additional 20 two-axle and three articulated vehicles. Two prototypes for the two-axle trolleybuses (numbered 5401–5402) were received by Muni in January 1999 and June 1999, respectively, while an articulated prototype (No. 7101) was received in April 2000. The 238 production-series two-axle trolleybuses (Nos. 5403–5640) were delivered between May 2001 and early 2004. The production-series articulateds (7102–7133) were all delivered in 2003. All 273 of Muni's ETI trolleybuses had entered service by April 2004.

Production
With both the Dayton and San Francisco orders, the chassis/body-frame (or shell) and motors of each vehicle were fabricated at Škoda's plant in Ostrov nad Ohří, Czech Republic, then shipped to a facility in Hunt Valley, Maryland (near other AAI facilities) for initial fitting-out. Except in the case of the prototypes, final fitting-out was undertaken in leased premises located in the two cities purchasing the vehicles, Dayton and San Francisco.

See also
List of trolleybus manufacturers (current and former trolleybus manufacturers)
United Streetcar – another joint venture between Škoda and a U.S. company

References
Various issues, Trolleybus Magazine. National Trolleybus Association (UK). Bimonthly.
Bushell, Chris (Ed.) (1998). Jane's Urban Transport Systems 1998–99, p. 557. Jane's Information Group (UK).

External links

United Industrial Corp. profile on Funding Universe, retrieved 2009-06-20.
"Skoda manufactures trolley busses (sic) for San Francisco" – 2001 audio clips from Radio Prague, retrieved 2009-06-20.

Defunct bus manufacturers of the United States
Škoda
Trolleybus manufacturers
American  companies established in 1994
Joint ventures
Companies based in Hunt Valley, Maryland
Textron
1994 establishments in Ohio
2004 disestablishments in Maryland
Electric vehicle manufacturers of the United States